Rita Thyagarajan alias Sucharitha Thyagarajan (born 10 June 1984), known by the mononym Rita, is an Indian playback singer who sings in Tamil, Telugu, Hindi, English, Kannada and Malayalam languages.

Early life
Rita was born in Chennai, Tamil Nadu. She was exposed to classical music very early in life and started attending classical Carnatic music lessons at the age of five. Her mother Lalitha Thyagarajan is a veteran illustrator and artist in Chennai and also a classical veena player while her father is employed with a popular Indian daily. She later started learning Hindustani classical music and has trained under celebrated masters in Chennai. Her sister is also trained in classical Carnatic music and runs her own design consultancy business in Chennai. Rita did her early schooling in P.S. Senior Secondary School in Mylapore and moved on to do a bachelor's degree in design from Stella Maris College like her mother and sister. It was in college that she discovered her penchant for other styles of music and experimented with commercial film and Western styles.

She is also a graphic designer and visualiser and co-founder of a design studio of integrated freelance professionals called Utopik.

Early career
Rita started her career with D. Imman, who contacted her after listening to her demo CD which she had recorded after college. "Yendan Varungaalaveetukaraney" from the movie Aanai was the first song she recorded and from then she has recorded over 300 songs and jingles in all major South Indian languages. She got her big break with the song "Vada Mapillai" in Villu, and then recorded songs like "Allegra" and "Mambo mamiyaa" for Kandasamy in Tamil. She was nominated for the Filmfare Award for the song "Allegra". Her song "Vada Mapillai" won Best Song of the Year at the Radio Mirchi Music awards. She recorded songs in Telugu like "Khilaadikoona" from Athidhi for Mani Sharma and "Panchadharabomma" for M. M. Keeravani which again won the Song of the Year award at the Radio Mirchi music awards.

Rita has worked with music directors like Ilaiyaraaja, Yuvan Shankar Raja, Mani Sharma, D. Imman, Vidyasagar, Devi Sri Prasad, S.S. Thaman, M. Jeychandran, and M. M. Keeravani. She also performs for stage shows in Singapore, Malaysia, Dubai, Sri Lanka, London, Amsterdam, France, Muscat, Canada, USA, and Australia.

Tamil

Telugu

Kannada

Malayalam

Television Title Songs
 Kalyana Parisu - 2014
 Vidhi - 2017
 Nila - 2019

References

Rita - Sunrisers - Tamil / Telugu

 My first break - Singer Rita

External Links

Sources

Living people
Indian women playback singers
Telugu playback singers
Tamil playback singers
Kannada playback singers
Malayalam playback singers
Singers from Chennai
1984 births
Women musicians from Tamil Nadu
21st-century Indian singers
21st-century Indian women singers